Venice Beach may refer to:

Venice, Los Angeles
 Venice Beach, the actual beach in Venice, which includes:
 Venice Beach Boardwalk
 Venice Beach Skatepark
 Venice Beach in Half Moon Bay State Beach